John Franklin III (born September 21, 1994) is a German-born American football wide receiver for the Memphis Showboats of the United States Football League (USFL). He played college football for Florida State, Auburn and Florida Atlantic. He also played junior college football for East Mississippi, where he was featured prominently in the first season of Last Chance U. He was signed by the Chicago Bears as an undrafted free agent in 2018.

College career
Before college, Franklin attended South Plantation High School in Fort Lauderdale, Florida. Franklin redshirted the 2013 season while playing for the Florida State Seminoles. The Seminoles won the 2014 BCS National Championship Game against the Auburn Tigers. He was the scout team quarterback mostly used to mirror what the Noles would deal with in Nick Marshall. Franklin saw limited action in 2014. He was a member of ACC champion 4×100 relay team at Florida State.

Franklin transferred to East Mississippi Community College after the 2014 season. At East Mississippi, Franklin served mostly as a backup quarterback to Wyatt Roberts, as the Lions won the MACJC North title. On October 22, 2015, Franklin scored six rushing touchdowns and one passing touchdown against Mississippi Delta, before the game was called off after a brawl broke out between both sides. The 2015 football season was documented in the Netflix series Last Chance U in 2016. On the year, Franklin went 64–110 (58.2%) while throwing for 733 yards along with a 7–2 touchdown to interception ratio. He also added 451 yards on the ground on only 43 attempts giving him an average of 10.5 yards per carry on his way to 9 rushing touchdowns.

Franklin enrolled at Auburn for his junior year, where he appeared in 12 games while making 1 start. In his 12 games he went 14–26 (53.8%) while throwing for 204 yards along with 1 touchdown. On the ground he added 430 yards on only 46 carries giving him an explosive average of 9.3 yards per carry, also adding 2 touchdowns. He grew increasingly unhappy with his role on the team and on March 8, 2017, ESPN reported he was moving to wide receiver for the 2017 season. 

On August 15, 2017, he transferred to FAU to play for Lane Kiffin as a graduate transfer. In limited action as a gadget player he showed his pure speed and explosiveness. He had 16 rushes for 229 yards with an average of 14.3 yards per carry while rushing for 2 touchdowns. He also caught 7 balls for 95 yards and 1 touchdown while averaging 13.6 yards a catch. He also went 1–2 (50%) for 49 yards.

At FAU's Pro Day in March 2018, Franklin was timed as running a 4.40 second 40-yard dash.

Professional career

Chicago Bears
After going undrafted in the 2018 NFL Draft, Franklin attended the Chicago Bears rookie mini camp on a tryout basis as a defensive back. On May 14, 2018, Franklin was signed by the Bears as an undrafted free agent. On September 1, 2018, he was waived by the Bears. He was re-signed to the practice squad on September 27, but was released later that day. Two months later, on November 24, he returned to Chicago's practice squad. He signed a reserve/future contract with the Bears on January 8, 2019. He was waived on August 31, 2019.

In October 2019, Franklin was drafted by the Dallas Renegades in the 2020 XFL Draft, but did not sign with the league.

Tampa Bay Buccaneers
On November 13, 2019, Franklin was signed to the Tampa Bay Buccaneers practice squad. He was promoted to the active roster on December 24, 2019, where he was listed as a wide receiver.

Franklin was placed on injured reserve on August 23, 2020, after suffering a leg injury during training camp. On February 7, 2021 he won the Super Bowl with the Tampa Bay Buccaneers, even though he did not play a single snap for the entire season.  He was waived on August 17, 2021.

On December 2, 2021, while still a free agent, he was suspended three games by the NFL for "misrepresenting [his] COVID-19 vaccination status".

Tampa Bay Bandits
Franklin was drafted by the Tampa Bay Bandits in the 17th round of the 2022 USFL Draft. He was transferred to the team's practice squad on April 16, 2022, and back to the active roster two days later.

Memphis Showboats
Franklin and all other Tampa Bay Bandits players were all transferred to the Memphis Showboats after it was announced that the Bandits were taking a hiatus and that the Showboats were joining the league.

References

External links
Tampa Bay Buccaneers bio
Florida Atlantic Owls bio
Auburn Tigers bio
ESPN College stats

1994 births
Living people
Sportspeople from Broward County, Florida
Sportspeople from Lower Saxony
Players of American football from Florida
German players of American football
People from Lüneburg
American football quarterbacks
American football cornerbacks
Florida State Seminoles men's track and field athletes
Florida State Seminoles football players
East Mississippi Lions football players
Auburn Tigers football players
Florida Atlantic Owls football players
Chicago Bears players
Tampa Bay Buccaneers players
Tampa Bay Bandits (2022) players
Franklin, John III